The Security Building is an historic structure located in downtown Cedar Rapids, Iowa, United States. It was designed by the Cedar Rapids architectural firm of Josselyn & Taylor, and it was completed in 1908. The building was individually listed on the National Register of Historic Places in 1977. In 2015 it was included as a contributing property in the Cedar Rapids Central Business District Commercial Historic District.

References

Commercial buildings completed in 1908
Buildings and structures in Cedar Rapids, Iowa
National Register of Historic Places in Cedar Rapids, Iowa
Office buildings on the National Register of Historic Places in Iowa
Individually listed contributing properties to historic districts on the National Register in Iowa
Office buildings in Iowa